Roworth is a surname. Notable people with the surname include:

 Edward Roworth (1880–1964), South African artist
 Wendy Wassyng Roworth, professor emerita of art history at the University of Rhode Island

See also
 Raworth
 Rowarth